Re K [1985] Ch 180 is an English land law case of acts of severance of a joint tenancy (one of two forms of  co-ownership of land).

Facts
A wife had been suffering severe domestic violence. In one of her husband's uncontrollable rages he had followed her into a room and she picked up a loaded shotgun and took off the safety catch, merely intending to threaten him. Unintentionally she shot and killed her husband. She was charged with murder but convicted of manslaughter instead, and got put on probation. He had bequeathed £1000 to her. His will left her nothing else. The questions were:
Whether she could benefit from survivorship (i.e. was there still a joint tenancy) and to the Will-bequeathed £1000 given the common law forfeiture rule
Whether she would be entitled to relief from forfeiture.

Judgement
Mr Justice John Vinelott held the threat of violence was serious enough for forfeiture. As this pre-dated the manslaughter she stood to lose absolutely his half-share in the property. Although the events were before the passing of the Forfeiture Act 1982, forfeiture was not precluded – for the confiscation the court had . Severance occurs if one beneficiary unlawfully kills another.

Taking into account their conduct and the wife’s financial position it was just for the wife to be relieved from forfeiture.

On appeal
The Court of Appeal unanimously upheld the decision of Vinelott J.

Cases applied
R v Chief National Insurance Comr, Ex parte Connor [1981] QB 758
Gray v Barr (Prudential Assurance Co Ltd Third Party) [1971] 2 QB 554

See also

English trusts law
English land law
English property law

References

1985 in England
1985 in case law
English trusts case law
English land case law
Court of Appeal (England and Wales) cases
1985 in British law